Céline Galipeau, OC, OQ, is a Canadian news anchor for Radio-Canada. Well known for her comprehensive and insightful coverage from Moscow, she is currently the weekday anchor of the network's flagship newscast Le Téléjournal.

Early life
Galipeau was born in Longueuil, Quebec in 1957.

Education
Galipeau earned her master's degree in political science and sociology from McGill University in 1983. She also studied English literature at the Al-Ahliyya Amman University in Jordan in 1976 and political science at Birzeit University in the West Bank in 1977.

Career
After a short stint in private TV and radio, Galipeau came to Toronto as a reporter for CBC and Radio-Canada in 1985 until she left for Montreal in 1987. In 1989, she returned to Toronto to become a national reporter. In 1992 she became a correspondent in London. Later, she transferred to Moscow where she covered Boris Yeltsin and the war in Chechnya. In 1997, she moved to Paris. In 2001, she became a foreign correspondent in Beijing. Galipeau won a Gemini Award for her coverage from Moscow.

She returned to Canada in 2003, becoming the weekend anchor for Le Téléjournal. She became the program's weekday anchor in December 2008 following the retirement of Bernard Derome. She was succeeded as weekend anchor by Pascale Nadeau.

Galipeau was named to the National Order of Quebec in June 2009, then to the Order of Canada in June 2013.

References

External links
  Radio Canada biography

1957 births
Living people
Canadian television news anchors
Canadian television reporters and correspondents
Canadian people of Vietnamese descent
Quebecers of French descent
Canadian Screen Award winning journalists
McGill University alumni
People from Longueuil
Officers of the National Order of Quebec
Al-Ahliyya Amman University alumni
Birzeit University alumni
Canadian women television journalists
Journalists from Quebec
Canadian Broadcasting Corporation people
Officers of the Order of Canada
20th-century Canadian journalists
21st-century Canadian journalists
20th-century Canadian women